The Big Time was a British documentary and reality television series made by the BBC, consisting of 15 original episodes which ran from 1976 to 1980. A revised, extended repeat of episode 12 was broadcast in 1981.

Devised and produced by Esther Rantzen and narrated initially by Rantzen but later by John Pitman, Paul Heiney and Norma Shepherd, each programme followed a member of the public placed in the limelight as a result of their skill and documenting how they fared. Their progress was filmed and sundry professionals in their fields advised the amateur as they progressed.

Some of the exploits included an amateur musician conducting an orchestra at the Fairfield Hall; a housewife becoming a TV presenter; a cookery competition winner becoming head chef for the day at The Dorchester hotel and preparing a banquet lunch for former Prime Minister Edward Heath; an amateur wrestler taking on professional John Naylor on a bill at the Albert Hall on 26 March 1980 (the amateur was given the stage name 'Rip Rawlinson'); a model entering the Miss United Kingdom beauty contest; an amateur footballer (Lol Cottrell) being trained by Liverpool player Tommy Smith to take part in the latter's testimonial game; a young gymnast who became a circus trapeze artist; an amateur singer getting the chance to record a single. The latter 'discovered' the singer Sheena Easton (with a follow-up Big Time special episode airing a year later, after she achieved stardom) and the edition featuring the amateur chef is credited as terminating the television career of the TV chef Fanny Cradock, who criticised the amateur's choice of menu.

When the series ended, the BBC commissioned In at the Deep End, which followed the same format only using two presenters, Chris Serle and erstwhile The Big Time reporter Paul Heiney (former reporters on Rantzen's That's Life!), as they undertook various tasks as complete beginners in professional roles.

Further versions of the format followed, when Hale and Pace (comedians Gareth Hale and Norman Pace) presented a short-lived series Jobs for the Boys on BBC TV in 1997, where they undertook professional tasks as complete amateurs. The four episodes featured the pair attempting to become professional polo players, dress designers, producers of a TV commercial and an effort to write Britain's 1998 Eurovision Song Contest entry. This format followed 1995's Jobs for the Girls, when Birds of a Feather stars Pauline Quirke and Linda Robson undertook four similar tasks.

The Gwen Troake incident
In 1976, a housewife in Devon, Gwen Troake, won a competition called "Cook of the Realm", leading to The Big Time inviting her to organise a banquet to be attended by Edward Heath, Earl Mountbatten of Burma and other VIPs. The BBC filmed the result as part of The Big Time, and asked Fanny Cradock, by then a tax exile in Ireland, to act as one of a number of experts giving Troake advice on her menu.

The result brought the end of Fanny Cradock's television career. Mrs Troake went through her menu of seafood cocktail, duckling with bramble sauce and coffee cream dessert. Fanny, grimacing and acting as if on the verge of retching, claimed not to know what a bramble was, told Troake that her menu was too rich, and, though she accepted that the dessert was delicious, insisted that it was not suitable, declaring: "Yes, dear, but you're among professionals now."

She suggested that Mrs Troake use a small pastry boat filled with a fruit sorbet and covered with spun sugar, decorated with an orange slice and a cherry through a cocktail stick, giving the dish the look of a small boat, which Fanny thought would be suitable for the naval guests. In the event, the dessert was a disaster and could not be served properly. Robert Morley had also been consulted on the menu and said he felt that Mrs Troake's original coffee pudding was perfect.

When the dessert failed to impress, the public were annoyed that Fanny Cradock had seemingly ruined Mrs Troake's special day. The Daily Telegraph wrote "Not since 1940 can the people of England have risen in such unified wrath". Fanny wrote a letter of apology to Mrs Troake, but it was too late as the BBC terminated her contract two weeks after the programme was broadcast. She never presented a cookery programme again on the BBC. (Mrs Troake, by contrast, published A Country Cookbook the following year.) Speaking about the incident in 1999, Rantzen described Cradock as "hell on wheels", and that she had "reduced this poor little lady [Troake] to nothing".

Episodes

Series 1
Broadcast Thursday evenings on BBC1 at 9:25pm

Series 2
Broadcast Thursday evenings on BBC1 at 9:25pm

Series 3
Broadcast Wednesday evenings on BBC1 at 8:10pm

In at the Deep End
An almost identical series followed in 1982 entitled In at the Deep End, which followed the same format as 'The Big Time' only using two celebrities, Chris Serle and Paul Heiney, as they undertook various tasks as complete beginners in professional roles. Challenges included Serle taking part in a ballroom dancing competition and becoming a snooker player partnering World champion Steve Davis in a mixed-doubles event and Heiney becoming a chef at Langhan's Brasserie, a dress designer for a catwalk show, a celebrity hairdresser (where he cut Jilly Cooper's hair), directing Bananarama's video for "A Trick of the Night" and an actor in a Michael Caine movie.

Series 1
Broadcast Tuesday evenings on BBC1 at 7:45pm

Series 2
Broadcast Wednesday evenings on BBC1 at 9:25pm

Series 3

References

External links

1976 British television series debuts
1987 British television series endings
1970s British documentary television series
1980s British documentary television series
British reality television series
BBC television documentaries
English-language television shows